Glenn may refer to:

Name or surname 
 Glenn (name)
 John Glenn, U.S. astronaut

Cultivars 
 Glenn (mango)
 a 6-row barley variety

Places 
In the United States:
 Glenn, California
 Glenn County, California
 Glenn, Georgia, a settlement in Heard County
 Glenn, Illinois
 Glenn, Michigan
 Glenn, Missouri
 University, Orange County, North Carolina, formerly called Glenn
 Glenn Highway in Alaska

Organizations 
Glenn Research Center, a NASA center in Cleveland, Ohio

See also
 New Glenn, a heavy-lift orbital launch vehicle
 
 
Glen, a valley
Glen (disambiguation)